Beverly Jean Sherwood (born May 29, 1947) is an American politician. She has served in the Virginia House of Delegates since 1994, representing the 29th district in the Shenandoah Valley, including the city of Winchester and parts of Frederick and Warren Counties. She is a member of the Republican Party.

Sherwood served on the Frederick County Board of Supervisors 1991–1993, before her election to the House to replace retiring Democrat Alson H. Smith.

Sherwood was chair of the House committee on Militia, Police and Public Safety 2002–2012. Since 2012, she has chaired the committee on Agriculture, Chesapeake and Natural Resources.

On June 11, 2013, Mark Berg defeated Sherwood in a Republican primary.

Electoral history

Notes

External links
 (campaign finance)

1947 births
Living people
Republican Party members of the Virginia House of Delegates
County supervisors in Virginia
Women state legislators in Virginia
People from Frederick County, Virginia
21st-century American politicians
21st-century American women politicians